The second HMS Talisman (N78), and the first to enter service under the name, was a T-class submarine of the Royal Navy. She was laid down by Cammell Laird & Co Limited, Birkenhead and launched on 29 January 1940.

Career
Talisman had a relatively short but active career, spending most of her time in the Mediterranean.

One of her first actions was the capture of the French fishing vessel Le Clipper, which was then used to observe U-boat movements off the Gironde estuary before being brought into Falmouth, Cornwall.  She later attacked HMS Otus by mistake, but was unsuccessful.  She went on to sink two sailing vessels, the Vichy-French passenger ship  and the Italian merchant Calitea, as well as destroying the grounded wreck of the German merchant Yalova.  She also unsuccessfully attacked the German merchant Salzburg and an Italian convoy, missing the Italian merchant Lauretta, and being heavily depth charged by the escorting .

Sinking
Talisman left Gibraltar on 10 September 1942 carrying supplies to Malta, where she was due no later than 18 September.

Nothing was heard from Talisman again and she failed to arrive at Malta. She is presumed either to have hit an Italian mine off Sicily or to have been destroyed by Italian surface forces on 17 September. She was declared overdue on 18 September 1942.

Notes

References

External links
 IWM Interview with Philip Francis, who commanded HMS Talisman from 1939 to 1940

 

British T-class submarines of the Royal Navy
Ships built on the River Mersey
1940 ships
World War II submarines of the United Kingdom
World War II shipwrecks in the Mediterranean Sea
Maritime incidents in September 1942
Ships lost with all hands
Lost submarines of the United Kingdom